Lindridge may refer to:

Lindridge, a village in Worcestershire, England
Lindridge/Martin Manor a town in Atlanta, Georgia, USA
Lindridge House a country house in Devon, England